ISO/IEC 8859-15:1999, Information technology — 8-bit single-byte coded graphic character sets — Part 15: Latin alphabet No. 9, is part of the ISO/IEC 8859 series of ASCII-based standard character encodings, first edition published in 1999. It is informally referred to as Latin-9 (and for a while Latin-0). It is similar to ISO 8859-1, and thus also intended for “Western European” languages, but replaces some less common symbols with the euro sign and some letters that were deemed necessary: This encoding is by far most used, close to half the use, by German, though this is the least used encoding for German.

ISO-8859-15 is the IANA preferred charset name for this standard when supplemented with the C0 and C1 control codes from ISO/IEC 6429.

Microsoft has assigned code page 28605 a.k.a. Windows-28605 to ISO-8859-15. IBM has assigned code page 923 (CCSID 923) to ISO 8859-15.

All the printable characters from both ISO/IEC 8859-1 and ISO/IEC 8859-15 are also found in Windows-1252. Since October 2016, less than 0.1% (actually currently less than 0.02%) of all web sites use ISO-8859-15.

History
The identifier ISO 8859-15 was proposed for the Sami languages in 1996, which was eventually rejected, but was passed as ISO-IR 197.

Ironically, the last three had already been present in DEC's Multinational Character Set (MCS) in 1983, a character set from which ECMA-94 (1985) and ISO-8859-1 (1987) were derived. Since their original codepoints were now occupied by other characters, less logical codepoints had to be chosen for their reintroduction.

The same proposal also recommended replacing 6 more characters with "some other characters to cover a maximum of languages".
For the euro sign, some wanted to replace the plus–minus sign instead of the currency sign.  The currency sign is used in some applications as a field separator and in some others to indicate subtotal. There was strong opposition to this. One person said "The proposed «+-» is not an adequate fall-back, as this sequence, though rarely used, has already a fixed mathematical meaning, quite different from «±»; and, even if a reader would deduce the intended meaning, «±», from the context, «+-» in lieu of «±» will hurt a physicist's æsthetic feelings at least as much as «oe» in lieu of an o-e ligature a Francophone's.."

The proposal was renamed to ISO 8859-15.

There were attempts to make ISO 8859-15 the default character set for 8-bit communication, but it was never able to supplant the popular ISO 8859-1. It did see some use as the default character set for the text console and terminal programs under Linux when the euro sign was needed, but the use of full Unicode was not practical, but this has since been replaced with UTF-8.

Coverage
ISO 8859-15 encodes what it refers to as "Latin alphabet no. 9". This character set is used throughout the Americas, Western Europe, Oceania, and much of Africa. It is also commonly used in most standard romanizations of East-Asian languages.

Each character is encoded as a single eight-bit code value. These code values can be used in almost any data interchange system to communicate in the following languages:

 Modern languages with complete coverage of their alphabet

Afrikaans
Albanian
Breton
Catalan
Danish
Dutch

English
Estonian
Faroese
Finnish
French
Galician

German (missing uppercase ẞ)
Icelandic
Irish
Italian
Latin
Luxembourgish

Malay
Norwegian
Occitan
Portuguese
Rhaeto-Romanic
Rotokas
Scottish Gaelic

Swedish
Tagalog
Walloon
Scots
Spanish
Swahili

Notes

Coverage of punctuation signs and apostrophes

For some languages listed above, the correct typographical quotation marks are missing, since only «, », ", and ' are included.

Also, this encoding does not provide the correct character for the apostrophe, and oriented single high quotation marks, although some texts use the spacing grave accent and spacing acute accent, which are both part of ISO 8859-1, instead of the 6-shaped/9-shaped quotations marks or apostrophes (and this works reliably with some font styles, where all these characters are displayed as slanted wedge glyphs).

Codepage layout
Differences from ISO-8859-1 have the Unicode code point shown underneath the character.

Aliases
ISO 8859-15 also has the following, vendor-specific aliases:
 WE8ISO8859P15 (Oracle database)

See also
Western Latin character sets (computing)

References

External links
ISO/IEC 8859-15:1999
ISO/IEC 8859-15:1998 - 8-bit single-byte coded graphic character sets, Part 15: Latin alphabet No. 9 (draft dated August 1, 1997; superseded by ISO/IEC 8859-15:1999, published March 15, 1999)
ISO Latin 9 as compared with ISO Latin 1
ISO-IR 203 European supplementary Latin set (September 16, 1998)

ISO/IEC 8859
Computer-related introductions in 1998